James Charles Campbell (11 April 1937 – 1994) was an English footballer who scored 37 goals from 144 appearances in the Football League playing on the right wing for West Bromwich Albion, Portsmouth and Lincoln City. He also played non-league football for Maidenhead United and Wellington Town.

References

1937 births
1994 deaths
Footballers from St Pancras, London
English footballers
Association football wingers
Maidenhead United F.C. players
West Bromwich Albion F.C. players
Portsmouth F.C. players
Lincoln City F.C. players
Telford United F.C. players
English Football League players
Place of death missing